Shamim Sikder (born 1953) is a Bangladeshi sculptor. She was awarded Ekushey Padak in 2000 by the Government of Bangladesh.

Education and career
Sikder enrolled at the Bulbul Academy of Fine Arts at the age of 15. In 1976, she moved to Sir John Cass School of Art in London.

Sikder served as a faculty member at Faculty of Fine Arts, University of Dhaka during 1980–2001.

Works
In 1974, Sikder built a sculpture in Dhaka Central Jail to commemorate Father of the Nation.
 Shoparjito Shadhinota (1990)
 Swadhinata Sangram (1999)

Gallery

Awards
 Ekushey Padak (2000)
 President's Award for Sculpture (1974)

References

1953 births
Living people
Bangladeshi sculptors
Academic staff of the University of Dhaka
Recipients of the Ekushey Padak
People from Bhedarganj Upazila